Puerto Rico Highway 187 (PR-187) is a road that travels from Río Grande, Puerto Rico to Carolina, passing through Loíza. This highway begins at its intersection with PR-3 and PR-66 in Guzmán Abajo and ends at PR-26 in Isla Verde.

Major intersections

Related route

Puerto Rico Highway 187R (abbreviated Ramal PR-187 or PR-187R) is a road that branches off from PR-187 to PR-3 in downtown Río Grande.

See also

 List of highways numbered 187

References

External links

 Carretera PR-187, Loíza, Puerto Rico

187